Tim Blackwell may refer to:
 Tim Blackwell (baseball), American baseball player, coach, and manager
 Tim Blackwell (broadcaster), Australian radio broadcaster